Zeuthen is a municipality in the district of Dahme-Spreewald in Brandenburg in Germany.

Geography
It is located near the southeastern Berlin city limits on the western shore of the Dahme River and the Zeuthener See. It borders Eichwalde in the north, Schulzendorf and Schönefeld in the west, Wildau and Königs Wusterhausen in the south, as well as the Berlin borough of Treptow-Köpenick (Schmöckwitz locality) on the eastern shore of Zeuthener See, where the municipal area also includes the Miersdorfer Werder exclave. The four municipalities of Zeuthen, Eichwalde, Wildau and Schulzendorf form a coherently built-up suburban area.

Zeuthen railway station is a stop on the Berlin-Görlitz line, it is served by the Berlin S-Bahn.

History

Probably of Slavic origin like many Brandenburg settlements, Zeuthen with neighbouring Miersdorf and Gersdorf was first mentioned in the 1375 Landbuch (domesday book) written at the behest of the Luxembourg emperor Charles IV, who had acquired the margraviate from the Bavarian House of Wittelsbach two years before.

Devastated in the Thirty Years' War and with a population of only 122 still in 1860, the rapid development of the former village on the riverside to a coveted suburban residential area began with the building of the railway line to Görlitz shortly afterwards and the rise of Berlin as capital of the German Empire in 1871. Zeuthen station was inaugurated on 1 November 1897. Neighbouring Miersdorf was merged into the Zeuthen municipality in 1957.

In World War II, the German Reichspostministerium research department under Wilhelm Ohnesorge had begun to build up a cyclotron particle accelerator and an isotope separator at Zeuthen, which from 1962 formed the nucleus of the East German Institute for High Energy Physics (IfH), part of the Academy of Sciences of the GDR. Following German reunification, the premises were merged as the second site of the DESY institute on 1 January 1992.

Demography

Politics

Seats in the municipal assembly (Gemeindevertretung) as of 2008 elections
Bürger für Zeuthen (Free Voters): 6
Social Democratic Party of Germany (SPD): 6
The Left: 4
Christian Democratic Union (CDU): 4
Alliance '90/The Greens: 1
Free Democratic Party (FDP): 1

Mayor 
On September 24, 2017 Sven Herzberger (no party affiliation) won the election for an eight-year term with 62.9% of the valid votes cast.

Past Mayors
 1990–1994 Karl-Ludwig Böttcher (SPD)
 1994–2010 Klaus-Dieter Kubick (No party affiliation)
 2010–2018 Beate Burgschweiger (SPD)
 since 2018 Sven Herzberger (No party affiliation)

International relations

Zeuthen is twinned with:
 Małomice, Poland
 Interlaken, Switzerland
 Düren, Germany

References

Localities in Dahme-Spreewald
Teltow (region)